Naxidia is a genus of moths in the family Geometridae.

Species
Naxidia glaphyra (Wehrli, 1931)
Naxidia hypocyrta (Wehrli, 1931)
Naxidia irrorata (Moore, 1888)
Naxidia maculata (Butler, 1879)
Naxidia nudariata (Poujade, 1895)
Naxidia punctata (Butler, 1880)
Naxidia roseni (Wehrli, 1931)
Naxidia semiobscura (Inoue, 1955)

References

Larentiinae